Gloucester National Park is a national park in Western Australia, 281 km south of Perth and about 3 km from Pemberton.

This park contains the Gloucester Tree, a renowned karri tree. Visitors can climb up to a viewing platform 60 m above the ground, using the climbing pegs inserted into the tree. The tree and the park are named after the city of Gloucester, England in 1946.

The tree served as a fire lookout and had the platform, cabin and climbing pegs installed in 1947, it was one of eight lookout trees constructed in the area between 1937 and 1952.

By 1963, it was estimated that over 3,000 people had climbed the tree, and in 1973 the original wooden cabin was demolished and replaced with an aluminium and steel cabin and gallery.

Another attraction in the park is The Cascades, a cascade waterfall in Lefroy Brook.

See also
 Protected areas of Western Australia

References

External links

 Gloucester National Park - Department of Environment and Conservation

National parks of Western Australia
Forests of Western Australia
Pemberton, Western Australia
Warren bioregion
Protected areas established in 1993
Sclerophyll forests